Phulan Rani (born 1928) is an Indian painter.

Early life and education 
Phulan Rani was born in 1928 in Amritsar. She belonged to a well to do Sikh family. Her mother died when she was an infant. Her father,Dr Ram Singh  was a doctor. She showed a great interest in fine arts, particularly for painting and dancing. Dr Ram Singh encouraged and nourished his daughter with deep care and pride. “My life really began when I started painting at thirteen,” she writes. “I have wonderful memories of that period making pencil drawings on the margins of the school books, attempting to draw sketches of persons and things that interested me.” She did not receive any formal training in art, but her education is in Liberal Arts and Psychology. She sought to watch other painters at work and slowly trained herself often working late into night. She followed the dictates of their inner urge even when in conflict with external necessity. She devoted more of her time to creative pursuits sometimes even at the expense of pressing her academic demands.

Personal life 
Rani married S. Shamsher Singh in 1944. Her husband had a love for fine arts. Together they raised a family and participated in the worlds of arts and letters in Punjab.  They ran the New Modern High School in Amritsar, and Phulan taught art as well. Her Father-in-law Kartar Singh Bumra also had an interest in painting. After her marriage when Rani made a painting, Kartar Singh Bumra was much impressed with it and he encouraged her with a cash prize of Rs. 100 and also presented her a book. She was happily married and in the new atmosphere to which great Kerala poet, Maha Kavi Sankara G.Kurup, referred in one of his letters addressed to her as " your happy home where poetry and art lead a blissful wedded life."

Career 
Rani started to paint at the age of thirteen. She had a wonderful memories of that period making pencil drawings on the margins of school books. Rani received encouragement in the Simla Fine Art Exhibition held in 1948, her water color painting " The Dancer", done in wash style, took the first prize. Again in 1953, in the Silver Jubilee Fine Arts Exhibition of the Indian Academy of Fine Arts, Amritsar, presided over by Dr. Rajendra Prasad, her well known work, "Twin Sisters Day and Night", received a gold medal and her two other exhibits " Memory and Moonlight" and " Wayside Rest" were widely acclaimed and celebrated.

Her activities associated with her position as the head of High School and as member of numerous social and literary organizations. She is a painter of varied rich spiritual experiences and even in her maturity she has retained the freshness of vision which is the special property of children and poets.

In 1955 she visited Kangra Valley and met Sobha Singh there. She brought her into close contact with the beauty of nature in its lush green terraced rice fields, its turbulent mountain streams, its dashing waterfalls and the endless ranges of the distant hills fading into the blue mist had a great impact on her mind of riotous carnival of beauty turned her overnight into a landscape painter and she started painting the eternally varying moods of this wonderful valley and its subtly evasive colors. In later years Phulan Rani in Amritsar and Sanat Kumar Chatterjee in Simla continued to paint in wash technique. Phulan Rani used the "wash" technique for melting colors to provide a romantic, poetic and emotional content to her works. Within the course of next five years she painted hundreds of landscapes depicting the charm of the valley and an exhibition of these works were organized at Amritsar in 1962 and it was inaugurated by the Speaker of Lok Sabha. Her paintings "Waterfall at Bhavarna", "Macchial Kund in the Evening," "Nohra Richard's Cottage" and " The sunset at Tatehal" are outstanding for their lyrical appeal and mastery over medium of water color. Her love for nature is her love of flowers and her flower studies are among the finest.

During her cultural trip to Europe in 1970 in connection with concerts entitled "Indian Ragas through Music and Painting" at the universities and cultural organizations, she organized exhibitions of her flower paintings; and to the British, a nation of flower lovers, her exhibits made a direct appeal and many of her flower studies were acquired by private collectors and art connoisseurs. Her flower studies " A wild Rose Bush" and "Flowers in conch shell", which, though as subject seem very modest reveal her attitude to the world of nature.

Rani also held solo exhibitions in different cities if India like Poona, Bombay, Kanpur, Ranchi, Calcutta and Chandigarh and won acclaim  on account of artistic excellence of her works, their graceful and tender purity of color of which "Strength and Grace" and "Wayside Rest" are admirable examples.

Subject matter 
Rani did a series of flower studies, landscape scenes and life drawings. She also did works on domestic genre, she devoted herself entirely to such lyrically themes as "The Bride", "The Heart Broken" and "The Afflicted." The Afflicted being one of her greatest paintings and on which she worked for four years.

During the birthday celebrations of Guru Gobind Singh she was commissioned by Guru Gobind SIngh Foundation, Patiala, to paint the whole life of Master in thirty paintings which she did in record time. Again during the Birth-day celebrations of Guru Nanak, in 1969, her pictorial biography of the great Guru won her an award of Rs. 1000/ from president Shri V.V.Giri. This book has been translated into English Braille for the benefit of the visually handicapped and has since been distributed among such centers all over the world. Her pictorial biography of Guru Tegh Bahadur, painted in the same strain, was selected for award by Punjab Govt. for being the best book of the year 1976-77. major episodes of Sikh Guru's life have been rendered with stately tenderness and compositional skill.

She also painted a series of love legends like " The desert of Manju", Sassi of the Sorrows", "Mirza Sahiban", "The Lure of His Flute". Her nobly conceived and admirably rendered paintings like " The Poet", "Time and Beauty", "The Poet and the Muses", "Megh doot" and "The Great Singers" are filled with the spirit of high romance and together with her Raga paintings.

Portraiture also received a considerable share of her attention and in the extensive gallery of portraits. She go into the inner world of her subject and brings out all that is best and beautiful in it. Portraits of " Saint Ravidas", "Rishi Valmik" located at the Municipal Corporation Hall, Amritsar, "Guru Nanak" in Air India Office, San Francisco; "Guru Gobind Singh" in Sikh Temple, Manchester and "Galib" in the collection of N.S. Virdi. Her technical skills in modifying tone in subtlest gradations from light to dark distinguishes her portraits from work of other artists.

Besides her contribution to the art of painting, her work in juvenile literature is no less substantial, having authored about a score books on a wide variety of themes, ranging from art, science, classics, morals and biographies. Two of her books, namely " Paudayan-da-jiwan(Life of Plants)", " Germ-ate-Asin ( Germs and We)" have received state awards.

Exhibitions

1946 
Won first prize for “The Dancer” at exhibition in Shimla.

1953 
Received gold medal at the Silver Jubilee exhibit of the Indian Academy of Fine   Arts at Amritsar, for her painting “Twin Sisters: Day and Night.”

1960-65 
Exhibition of landscapes at Amritsar. Exhibitions at Poona, Bombay and Kolkata. The Poona exhibit included 150 Kangra Valley paintings .  These include “Waterfall near Bharvan,” “Waterfall at Andretta,” and “Road Through Rice Fields.”

This article has been adapted from Visions Of Beauty by Phulan Rani.

References

Bibliography 
 Tampy, K. P. Padmanabhan., and Shamsher Singh.(1981)Visions of Beauty by Phulan Rani. Amritsar
 Kaur Singh.Nikky-Guninder(2011) - Sikhism : An Introduction. I.B.Tauris & Co Ltd.  (HB)
 Singh, Nikky-Guninder Kaur. The Birth of the Khalsa: A Feminist Re-memory of Sikh Identity. Albany: State U of New York, 2005. Print.
 Parimoo,Ratan and Sarkar, Sandip(2009) - Historical Development of Contemporary Indian Art 1880-1947; Lalit Kala Akademi;New Delhi. 

1928 births
Living people
Indian women painters
20th-century Indian painters
Painters from Punjab, India
Women artists from Punjab, India
20th-century Indian women artists
21st-century Indian women artists